John Bertram Andrews (1880–1943) was an American economist.

Background
John Bertram Andrews born in 1880 in South Wayne, Wisconsin, and was educated at the University of Wisconsin and at Dartmouth College.

Career
Andrews taught economics at both the University of Wisconsin and Dartmouth College.

In 1906, he co-founded the American Association for Labor Legislation (AALL) with other economists. In 1911, he founded the American Labor Legislation Review with the purpose of recording advances in social reforms.

In 1921, Andrews was called by President Harding to serve on the Unemployment Conference. He was a member of the secretariat to the League of Nations' first official International Labor Conference in Washington, D.C.

Works
Together with John R. Commons, he was the author of Principles of Labor Legislation (1916) and History of Labor in the United States (1918).

References

External links
 

American male essayists
Economists from Wisconsin
University of Wisconsin–Madison alumni
1880 births
1943 deaths
People from South Wayne, Wisconsin
20th-century American essayists
20th-century American male writers
20th-century American economists